"S.O.S., Fire In The Sky" is a hit song recorded by the Grammy Award-winning artist and producer Deodato for his 1984 album Motion and released by Warner Bros Records. The song, which featured vocals by Camille and was written by Rick Suchow and Alan Palanker, reached the Billboard Top 20 Dance Chart and stayed on for 14 weeks in 1985. It also entered the Top 10 Pop chart in France and Holland - and achieved number one on the dance chart in Holland. The album was re-issued in 2006 by Wounded Bird Records.

Personnel on the Deodato track includes Eumir Deodato and Alan Palanker (keyboards and programming), Rick Suchow (bass synth and drum programming), Earl Gardener (trumpet), Bob Malach (tenor sax), Keith O'Quinn (trombone), and Jerry and Katrese Barnes (background vocals), while Camille handled lead vocal and some backgrounds. The song was produced by Deodato.

The song is used for TV Bandeirantes (Band), a Brazilian TV network, in your promos.

References

1984 songs